The 1996 Copa Libertadores Final was a two-legged football match-up to determine the 1996 Copa Libertadores champion. It was contested by Argentine club River Plate and Colombian club América de Cali. The first leg was played at Pascual Guerrero Stadium in Cali, while the second leg was held in Estadio Monumental of Buenos Aires.

River Plate won the series 2–1 on aggregate.

Qualified teams

Venues

Match summary

First leg

Second leg

References 

1
l
l
l
l
Football in Buenos Aires